John Baptiste Charles Lucas (August 14, 1758 – August 17, 1842) was a French-born member of the U.S. House of Representatives from Pennsylvania. After meeting Benjamin Franklin, Lucas was so inspired—and so impatient with class injustices in France—that he sailed to America. Armed with a letter of introduction from Franklin, Lucas was made a federal land grant judge by Thomas Jefferson, then elected to the U.S. House of Representatives. He eventually resigned and moved to St. Louis, reportedly in part because he and his wife, Anne, missed French society.

Biography
Lucas was born in Pont-Audemer, Normandy, France.  He attended the Honfleur and Paris Law Schools, and graduated from the law department of the University of Caen in 1782.  He practiced law in France until 1784, when he immigrated to the United States and settled near Pittsburgh, Pennsylvania.  He engaged in agricultural pursuits.

Lucas was a member of the Pennsylvania House of Representatives from 1792 to 1798.  He served as judge of the Court of Common Pleas in 1794.

In the early 1800s, newly-elected President Thomas Jefferson appointed Lucas to a secret mission to St. Louis and New Orleans. Lucas reported directly to the president on the sentiments of the Spaniards in those cities toward the United States, in preparation for Jefferson's efforts at westward expansion.

With strong support from President Jefferson, Lucas was elected as a Republican to the Eighth and Ninth Congresses and served until his resignation in 1805, before the assembling of the Ninth Congress.  He moved to St. Louis (then part of the Louisiana Territory), having been appointed district judge for the District of Louisiana (which became Missouri Territory in 1812), and served from 1805 until 1820, when he resigned.  He also served as commissioner of land claims of northern Louisiana from 1805 to 1812.  He then resumed agricultural pursuits.

While in Missouri, Lucas donated land in downtown St. Louis in 1816 for a courthouse (known as the Old St. Louis County Courthouse) that is now part of the Gateway Arch National Park.  When the courthouse was abandoned in 1930 as the court functions relocated to larger quarters, his descendants fought unsuccessfully to get the courthouse back. The Gateway Arch frames the view of the courthouse from the Mississippi River.

Lucas died near St. Louis in 1842. He was buried at Calvary Cemetery. Five of Lucas' sons were to die violently, including Charles Lucas, who was killed in a duel with Senator Thomas Hart Benton. A grandson, Henry Van Noye Lucas, owned a major league baseball franchise in St. Louis in the late 19th century.

References

Sources

The Political Graveyard

1758 births
1842 deaths
People from Eure
French emigrants to the United States
Members of the Pennsylvania House of Representatives
Judges of the United States District Court for the District of Louisiana
University of Caen Normandy alumni
18th-century French lawyers
Politicians from St. Louis
Burials at Calvary Cemetery (St. Louis)
United States federal judges appointed by Thomas Jefferson
19th-century American judges
Democratic-Republican Party members of the United States House of Representatives from Pennsylvania
Judges of the Pennsylvania Courts of Common Pleas